The Gwichya Gwich'in First Nation is a Gwich'in First Nations band government in the Northwest Territories. The band is located in Tsiigehtchic, a small, predominantly Gwich'in community on the Arctic Red River.

The Gwichya Gwich'in First Nation is a member of the Gwich'in Tribal Council.

References

First Nations in the Northwest Territories
Gwichyaa Gwichʼin